The Batè Empire (N’ko: ߓߊߕߍ߫ Bátɛ) was a pre-colonial state centred on Kankan in what is today Guinea. It was founded in the 16th century by migrants from the Sahel, Mandinka and Soninke people, as an Islamic merchant state. The founders settled on the left shore of the Milo River in Upper Guinea, and made Kankan their capital. They practiced a devout form of Islam and were known for their piety. In the first half of the eighteenth century, Batè leaders aligned with the Fula people from the Imamate of Futa Jallon, which was a rising military power to their west. In the 1870s, the Batè increasingly suffered from conflict and raids in their territory. They sought protection from Samori Ture and agreed to merge with his Wassoulou Empire. The Batè remained within the Wassoulou Empire until Ture's capture and exile to Gagon in 1898, becoming part of the colonized areas of France.

History 
Bate or empire of batè was founded by some Soninké Clan (Fofana, Kakoro, Kaba and Cissé), whose were immigrate from Jafunun and Karta, and was installed primarily in Bakonkokodo and Diankana, which hosted the other people and were expanded to other areas until it was developed and become a tribal state. 

The Kaba Clan was hosted by Kakoro's in Diankana, they founded their first village in the eastern of Jankana named Kojan, before they detached to go installed in the far west of Diankana, 10 KM away named Kabalaba. After their father's death, all of them conquered his own village (Bate nafadji, Soumankoi, Bankalan and Karifamoudouya), another village was founded by their youngest brother before moved and reinstalled in Kankan. 

The Fofana of Bakonkokodo too's hosted the Béreté's of Kofilanen, Cissé's of Bakonko–cisséla, Diane's of Soila, and Kaba's of Tasliman, they also Hosted the others cities in neighbouring tribal states: Djolibakodo, Fodekareah, Tiniedo, Dalaba and Kagan. 

They organized the state and most of its was founded with Principe of Islam, which the most of the Clan were converted in Islam since the times of kumbi sale, and they were named by Mande as Mande-mori (Muslim of Mande).

Kankan 
After he founded his first village in some where, Dauda Kaba found a new place and demanded his uncle Fedemoudou Conde in Makonon to give him. He started asking him until he understood that he's the son of his sister Dusu Conde, he asked his uncle, where do you need? I am thinking about the Drametu area. He gives him and says: anywhere that you are thinking around there, I give you. At this moment, the place was a hamlet's jungle with numerous baobab trees. The village was founded around 1790 and named as Fadu (fadou) before changed as Nabaya, and after the massive immigration from Futa Jalon, it was renamed as Kankan which means the defenses (or God protect our city from all the attacks). After this immigration, there were two neighborhood named after the two capital city of Futa Jalon, Fugumba and Timbo and the latest one existing.

Defense or war 
Bate didn't have representative authority, king or other forms of governing. They formed the theocratic and cultural form and held a few of the army to protect the town from the slave sellers and holders. They spent a long time teaching the children with the Quran and other cultural activities. They were also building little fortresses in some parts of the town. 

One day, when they got information that Conde-béréma Diakité (wasolon) is preparing to attack their state, all the inhabitants of Bate were immigrate to Futa Jalon especially Timbo and Fugumba due to Islamic relation between the two theocratic states. The immigration took seven years. 

Another war against bate was prepared by another kings of Wasolon, Diédi and Djiba (or DJI), to first conquering Kankan the capital of the state, which was defeated by the Kankan's army directed by Alpha-Mamoudou Kaba.

References

Former empires in Africa
History of Guinea